In taxonomy, Methanohalophilus is a genus of the Methanosarcinaceae.

The species are strictly anaerobic and live solely through the production of methane, using methyl compounds as substrates. The genus Methanohalophilus contains three moderately halophilic species, Methanohalophilus mahii isolated from Utah's Great Salt Lake in the United States, Methanohalophilus halophilus isolated from Shark Bay in Australia, and Methanohalophilus portucalensis isolated from a salt pan in Portugal. It also contains Methanohalophilus oregonese, which is alkaliphilic.

References

Further reading

Scientific journals

Scientific books

Scientific databases

See also
Methanogen

External links

Type strain of Methanohalophilus portucalensis at BacDive -  the Bacterial Diversity Metadatabase

Archaea genera
Euryarchaeota